Bulbophyllum unguiculatum is a species of orchid in the genus Bulbophyllum. It is commonly known as the clawed bulbophyllum. It is found in Sumatra, Java, Borneo and Sulawesi in lower montane forests.

References

External links 
The Bulbophyllum-Checklist
The Internet Orchid Species Photo Encyclopedia

unguiculatum